Pragoserpulinidae is an extinct family of Paleozoic gastropod mollusks.

This family is unassigned to superfamily. This family has no subfamilies.

References 

Prehistoric gastropods